The Dutch and Flemish collection in the National Museum of Serbia in Belgrade consists of more than 500 works (210 paintings of art and 220 graphics and engravings, and over 80 drawings). The National Museum of Serbia was the first museum in the world to include a Piet Mondrian painting in its permanent display. Represented artists include  Juan de Flandes,  Hieronymus Bosch, Cornelis de Vos, Anthony van Dyck, Antonis Mor, Jan Brueghel the Elder, Marten de Vos, Joos van Cleve, Jan Antonisz. van Ravesteyn, Rubens,  Jan van Goyen, Justus Sustermans, Cornelis de Vos, Willem van Aelst, Frans van Mieris, Sr., Paulus Potter, Caspar Netscher, Jan Frans van Bloemen, Adam Frans van der Meulen,  Godfried Schalcken, Adriaen van Utrecht, Johan Jongkind, Jan Victors, Kees van Dongen, Anton Mauve, Allart van Everdingen, Vincent van Gogh and Piet Mondrian.

Dieric Bouts, attribution Adoration of Magi (tempera 76 x 89)
Juan de Flandes, Behold the Lamb of God, oil on wood, c. 1497, 80 x 52 cm
Hieronymus Bosch, The Temptation of Saint Anthony, tempera on panel
Joos van Cleve, Portrait of a man with the rosary
Jan Sanders van Hemessen, Ruler getting tribute
Antonis Mor,  Portrait of Spanish Nobleman
Marten de Vos, Paradise
Jan Brueghel the Elder, Flowers and (attributed) Landscape with John the Baptist (oil on panel)
Rubens (2 paintings) Diana gifts catch to Pan oil on canvas, 145 x 211.5 cm, c. 1615 and Roman Emperor Galba oil on panel
Jan Thomas van Ieperen, Leopold I in Costume and Empress Margaritha Theresia
Flemish School, Saint Anna and Saint, (early 15th century),
Jan Antonisz. van Ravesteyn, Portrait of Man with black cap
Justus Sustermans, Portrait of woman'
Anthony van Dyck (1 painting,1 attributed) Self-Portrait, oil on canvas and Portrait of a Man with a Green OvercoatFrans van Mieris, Sr., The Music LessonCornelis de Vos, Portrait of young girlGerard de Lairesse, Heracle and Omfala (73 x 102 cm oil on panel)
Gerrit Dou, Boy with the Glass on the WindowJan Steen, Scene in the Church (miniature tempera on ivory, 9 x 12 cm)
Adriaen van Utrecht, Game TraderSebastian Vrancx BattleNicolas Régnier, Judith with Halophen's Head (Oil on Canvas 98 x 123 cm c. 1630)
Roelant Savery,  A wagon in the forestAdriaen van der Werff, Flute LessonsAbraham van Beijeren, Still Life with Grapes, Pomegranate and Ostrych, Still Life with the Melon, Peaches and GrapesJan van Goyen, LandscapeNicolaes Pieterszoon Berchem, StormFlemish School, Horseman with trumpet (16th century)
Jan Abrahamsz Beerstraaten, Port (1665)
Adriaen Brouwer, At the tavernAllaert van Everdingen, Landscape with the seaAnthonie Palamedesz., Soldier with LetterJan Frans van Bloemen, Landscape in Arcadia (oil on canvas, 65 x 49 cm, 1738), Landscape with FiguresPaulus Potter, Landscape with CowsOsias Beert. Still Life with the DragonflyThéobald Michau, Landscape with the CattleAdam Frans van der Meulen, People in the GardenDavid Teniers the Elder, Sathyr and Nympha, At the Tavern, In the front of TavernAbraham van Beijeren (2 paintings) Still life with fruit and Still Life with Melon and PeachesJan Victors, Portrait of ChildrenAdriaen van de Velde, LandscapeJoost Cornelisz Droochsloot, Dutch villageGodfried Schalcken, WomanWillem van Aelst, Still Life with peacockCaspar Netscher, LadyAdriaen van de Velde, LandscapeAdam Frans van der Meulen, Group at gardenCarel de Moor, Girl with the DogRoelof Jansz van Vries, Landscape with cottageLieve Verschuier, StormJacques d'Arthois, LandscapePieter Mulier II, Pastorale Composition (Oil on Canvas 128 x 195 cm), Landscape with Sarcophagus (canvas 47 x 159 cm)
Osias Beert, Still LifeNicolaes Pieterszoon Berchem, Landscape with shepherd and Landscape with mountains and shepherdVincent van Gogh (1 painting,1 drawing) Peasant Woman Standing Indoor and The writer at his deskJan Toorop, Of the seaOtto van Rees, GirlIsaac Israëls, Female DrummerAlfred Stevens (painter), Shells collectingBergen School (art) Dirk Filarski, Village view of GiethoornGeorge Hendrik Breitner, Ships in the PortJohannes Evert Hendrik Akkeringa, Still LifeWillem de Zwart, Barn with cattleJan Sluyters, Nude, Two FishermansJohan Jongkind, Landscape from Grenoble (aquarel)
Bergen School (art) -by Harrie Kuyten, Landscape with the farmKees van Dongen, Female portraitPiet Mondrian, Composition IICarel Willink, Two Thirty at night (gouache) and Composition (tempera)
Pulchri Studio (Kelder Toon), Head of the boy with red tieFloris Jespers, Flemish countrysideConstant Permeke, (2 paintings) Countryside and DunesKees Maks, CircusMédard Tytgat, Little YvonAndré Hallet, Port in OstendeLizzy Ansingh, Dolls'' (canvas 77 x 61)

References

Collections of the National Museum of Serbia
Lists of paintings
Dutch paintings
Flemish paintings